Jewish Lights Publishing is a publishing company. Founded in 1990 by Stuart Matlins in Woodstock, Vermont, the company publishes works for children and adults that come from a Judaic perspective, yet provide wisdom to readers of any spiritual background. Topics covered include Jewish mysticism and spirituality, social justice, self-help, interfaith, and Jewish life cycle events.  The company was a division of LongHill Partners along with sister companies SkyLight Paths Publishing and GemStone Press. In 2016, LongHill Partners sold its publishing program to Turner Publishing Company.

References

External links

Book publishing companies based in Vermont
Jewish printing and publishing
Jews and Judaism in Vermont
Publishing companies established in 1990
1990 establishments in Vermont